Conversa com Bial (English: Talk with Bial) is a Brazilian late-night talk show hosted by Pedro Bial.

References

External links
 Official website

2017 Brazilian television series debuts
2010s Brazilian television series
Brazilian television talk shows
Rede Globo original programming
Portuguese-language television shows